Wellington railway station is a railway station serving Wellington town, near Coonoor in the Indian state of Tamil Nadu. The station is a part of the World Heritage Nilgiri Mountain Railway. The station belongs to the Salem railway division and comes under the Southern Railway. The station code is WEL.

References

External links

Railway stations in Nilgiris district
Railway stations opened in 1908
Salem railway division
1908 establishments in India
Mountain railways in India